The 4th Golden Raspberry Awards were held on April 8, 1984, at Third Street Elementary School in Los Angeles, California, to recognize the worst the movie industry had to offer in 1983.

Amy Irving, nominated for worst supporting actress for her performance in Yentl, also received a nomination for the Academy Award for Best Supporting Actress for the same performance in 1984. Irving became the second person, after supporting actor James Coco in 1982, to be nominated for a Razzie and Oscar for the same work, a feat not repeated until Glenn Close in 2021.

Winners and nominees

Films with multiple nominations 
These films received multiple nominations:

See also

1983 in film
56th Academy Awards
37th British Academy Film Awards
41st Golden Globe Awards

References

External links
Official summary of awards
Nomination and award listing at the Internet Movie Database

Golden Raspberry Awards
04
1983 in American cinema
1984 in California
April 1984 events in the United States
Golden Raspberry